Nadia Makram Ebeid is an Egyptian academic who served as the minister of state for environment being the first Egyptian woman who served in the post.

Biography
Ebeid is from a Coptic family originally based in Qena where her uncle was the politician Makram Ebeid. Her cousin is Mona Makram-Ebeid. 

Ebeid received a master of arts degree from American University of Cairo in 1977. She was appointed minister of environment in July 1997 in a reshuffle of the cabinet led by Prime Minister Kamal  Ganzouri. The office was newly established, and Ebeid became the first environment minister of Egypt. She remained to serve in the office until 2002. When she was in office, she also served as the vice-chair of the executive bureau of the Council of Arab Ministers Responsible for the Environment (CAMRE) and of the board of trustees of the Centre for Environment and Development for the Arab Region and Europe (CEDARE). Between 2002 and 2003 she was the first special peace envoy of the Arab League to Sudan. She was a visiting professor at George Washington University, USA. As of 2016 she was the executive director of CEDARE.

References

20th-century Egyptian women politicians
20th-century Egyptian politicians
21st-century Egyptian women politicians
21st-century Egyptian politicians
Women government ministers of Egypt
The American University in Cairo alumni
Year of birth missing (living people)
Living people
People from Qena
Coptic politicians